The Lac aux Montagnais is a freshwater body at the head of the rivière aux Montagnais, in the unorganized territory of Lac-Jacques-Cartier, in the La Côte-de-Beaupré Regional County Municipality, in the administrative region of Capitale-Nationale, in the province, in Quebec, Canada. "Lac aux Montagnais" is located in the northwestern part of the Laurentides Wildlife Reserve.

Lac aux Montagnais is located between route 169 (connecting Quebec (city) to Alma) and route 155 (connecting La Tuque and Chambord). A forest road bypasses the northern part of the lake. Some secondary forest roads serve this area for forestry and recreational tourism activities.

Forestry is the main economic activity in the sector; recreational tourism, second.

The surface of "Lac aux Montagnais" is usually frozen from the beginning of December to the end of March, however the safe circulation on the ice is generally made from mid-December to mid-March.

Geography 
The main watersheds neighboring Lac aux Montagnais are:
 north side: Moufettes lake, Carbonneau lake, rivière aux Écorces;
 east side: Métascouac Lake, lac Tomachiche, lac Monbrion, lac aux Écorces, rivière aux Écorces;
 south side: lac aux Cailloux, Berthiaume Lake, Métascouac River, Métabetchouane River, Saint-Henri Lake;
 west side: Montagnais River, Moncouche River, Métabetchouane River, ruisseau Contourné, Lac Saint-Jean.

This lake is mainly fed by riverside streams, the outlet of Lake Houlette, the Montagnais river (coming from the south) and the Friendship stream. A peninsula attached to the north shore stretches  to the south.

The mouth of Lac aux Montagnais is located at the bottom of a bay at the extreme southeast of the lake, at:
  north-west of Métascouac Lake;
  south-east of the confluence of the Montagnais River and the Moncouche River;
  south-east of the confluence of the Moncouche River and Métabetchouane River;
  south-west of Lac aux Écorces;
  east of the village center of Van Bruyssel located along the Canadian National railway;
  south-east of lac Saint-Jean at the mouth of the Métabetchouane river.

From the mouth of Lac aux Montagnais, the current follows the course of:
 rivière aux Montagnais on  generally towards the northeast;
 Moncouche River on  generally towards the southwest;
 Métabetchouane River on  generally towards the northwest;
 Saguenay River via the Petite Décharge on  eastwards to Tadoussac where it merges with the Saint Lawrence estuary.

Toponymy 
The specific term “Montagnais” designates one of the indigenous nations of the Algonquian family in eastern Canada, today known as “Innu”. On the south shore, their territory included the hydrographic basins of the Rivière du Loup and the Matane River. Already in 1892, the surveyor Henry O'Sullivan described the lake in these terms: “Lac Montagnais. It is a magnificent sheet of water with a circumference of more than six miles. Well provided with spotted trout ”. Today, permanent installations welcome vacationers, hunters and fishermen to this lake formerly frequented, no doubt, by the Innu in the vicinity of Lac Saint-Jean.

The toponym lac aux Montagnais was formalized on December 5, 1968, by the Commission de toponymie du Québec.

See also 
 La Côte-de-Beaupré Regional County Municipality
 Lac-Jacques-Cartier, a TNO
 Laurentides Wildlife Reserve
 Rivière aux Montagnais
 Moncouche River
 Métabetchouane River
 Lac Saint-Jean
 Saguenay River
 St. Lawrence River
 List of lakes of Canada

References 

Lakes of Capitale-Nationale
La Côte-de-Beaupré Regional County Municipality
Laurentides Wildlife Reserve